The 2000 Bitburger / AvD 1000 km of Nürburgring was the fourth round of the 2000 American Le Mans Series season.  It took place at the Nürburgring, Germany, on July 9, 2000.

This was the second European round of the American Le Mans Series season.  It, along with the Silverstone 500, served as a precursor to the creation of the European Le Mans Series.  It gauged the willingness of European teams from the FIA Sportscar Championship and FIA GT Championship to participate in a series identical to the American Le Mans Series.

This was the first planned 1000 km event at the Nürburgring since 1988, although the World Sportscar Championship had run shorter events until 1991.

Race results
Class winners in bold.

Statistics
 Pole Position - #77 Audi Sport North America - 1:27.938
 Fastest Lap - #78 Audi Sport North America - 1:30.418
 Distance - 842.860 km
 Average Speed - 146.190 km/h

References
 
 

Nurburgring
1000 km Nurburgring
6 Hours of Nürburgring